Jumbo is an unincorporated community in Hardin County, in the U.S. state of Ohio.

History
Jumbo had its start in 1881 when Walter Blansfield opened a store there. A post office was established at Jumbo in 1883, and remained in operation until 1901. The community was named after Jumbo, the circus elephant.

References

Unincorporated communities in Hardin County, Ohio
1881 establishments in Ohio
Populated places established in 1881
Unincorporated communities in Ohio